C. darwini may refer to:

 Caerostris darwini, Darwin's bark spider
 Calosima darwini, Adamski & Landry, 1997, a moth species
 Canthidium darwini
 Carios darwini
 Cavernulina darwini
 Centrodora darwini
 Ceratina darwini
 Chelonoidis darwini a species of Galápagos tortoise
 Chionelasmus darwini
 Cleonus darwini
 Cryptocercus darwini, a cockroach species in the genus Cryptocercus

See also 
 C. darwinii (disambiguation)
 Darwini (disambiguation)